Bezmiechowa may refer to the following places in Poland:

Bezmiechowa Dolna
Bezmiechowa Górna